The 1949 Australian Grand Prix was a motor race held at the Leyburn Airfield in Queensland, Australia on 18 September 1949. The race was staged over 35 laps of the 7.0 kilometre circuit, which was laid out on the runways and taxiways of a World War II airbase located six kilometres north of the town of Leyburn. The total race distance was 150.5 miles (242.2 kilometres).

The race is recognised by the Confederation of Australian Motor Sport as the fourteenth Australian Grand Prix. It was the first Australian Grand Prix to be held in Queensland and the first to feature a mass start of the entire grid. The 1949 Australian Grand Prix was the first Australian Grand Prix to be held with grid positions decided by practice times. The race, which was organised by the Queensland Motor Sporting Club, attracted a crowd of approximately 40,000 people.

John Crouch won the race driving a Delahaye 135MS. Ray "Laddie" Gordon (MG TC Special) finished second ahead of third placed Arthur Rizzo (Riley Special).

Event overview 
The 1949 Australian Grand Prix was hosted at an abandoned Royal Australian Air Force (RAAF) airbase, Leyburn Airfield in Leyburn by the Queensland Motor Sporting Club. The race took place on the old runways of the decommissioned base in the Darling Downs. The use of airfields for the hosting of Grand Prix events had become common following World War II. Victoria hosted the 1948 Australian Grand Prix at an airfield in Point Cook in the previous year.

The Queensland Motor Sporting Club decided that the official practice on the circuit for the 1949 Australian Grand Prix was to be held on 11 and 17 September. The town of Leyburn has a long history of motor racing which started with the 1949 Australian Grand Prix which coincided with the start of Leyburn Sprints.

There was a total of 28 competitors for the first Queensland held Grand Prix around the 6.92 km track. Out of the 28 cars that began the race only 11 finished. The eventual winner of the Grand Prix was John Crouch, a motor sales manager in his private life. The 1949 race was the fourth Australian Grand Prix in which Crouch had participated  and he won the race driving a blue Delahaye which he had acquired after the war. Crouch finished the Grand Prix with a time that was 5 minutes (approximately 2 laps) faster than second placed Ray Gordon who drove an MG TC Special. Behind Gordon finishing in third place was Arthur Rizzo in the Riley Special, followed by Peter Critchley in the MG TB Special in fourth. Alan Larsen finished the 1949 Australian Grand Prix in fifth position driving the Cadillac Special.

The crowd was projected to be an estimated 20,000 people. The crowd on the day of the 1949 Australian Grand Prix exceeded expectations with an overall estimation of 30,000 spectators in attendance. The spectators for the event contributed to the £6,000 (an estimated £217,490.80 or $397,299.01 AUD in 2021) accrued in gate ticket sales.

Prior to the commencement of the main race, the 1949 Australian Grand Prix, the 28 cars participating did one lap of the course while three Mustangs flew over the airfield performing an aerobatic display.

The Grand Prix featured a massed start rather than a handicap start, the latter format having been used for each race from 1931 to 1948.

The 1949 Australian Grand Prix and other events on the programme for the day took place without the occurrence of any crashes despite the heavily gravelled nature of Leyburn Airfield.

The prize money for the 1949 Australian Grand Prix was a total purse of £645(an estimated value of £23,380.26 or $42,709.64 AUD in 2021). With the winner, John Crouch, receiving £150 (an estimated value of £5,437.27 or $9,932.48 AUD in 2021) for his winning performance in the race. Ray Gordon who finished in second place received £75 (an estimated value of £2,718.64 or $5,002.89 AUD in 2021). Arthur Rizzo received £50 for finishing in third place (an estimated value of £1,812.42 or $3,335.25 AUD). Peter Critchley won £35 (an estimated £1,268.70 or $2,334.69 AUD) for finishing the Grand Prix in fourth place. Alan Larsen won (an estimated £724.97 or $1,334.10 AUD) for finishing the race in fifth place. Crouch's winning time for the 150-mile circuit was 1 hour 49 minutes and 25 seconds at an average speed of 82.5 miles an hour.

Public reception 
It was assumed a crowd of 20,000 spectators would attend the Queensland Motor Sporting Club organised Grand Prix on 18 September 1949. The crowd exceeded expectations with a total of 30,000 spectators, with some accounts stating 50,000 in attendance to watch John Crouch win the Grand Prix in his 10th attempt at claiming line honours.

The full day programme had been finalised on 30 July 1949, with both motor car and cycle racing to take place on the day of the 1949 Australian Grand Prix on 18 September. The first event of the day was scheduled to commence at 10 a.m.

Despite the high attendance of the 1949 Australian Grand Prix from the spectators, the competitors preferred competing on a non-airfield track such as the track in the following 1950 Australian Grand Prix, at Nuriootpa.

The crowd at Leyburn Airfield for the Australian Grand Prix surrounding the track stretched four people deep for an estimated 2 and a half to three miles (Equating to 4.02336 km to 4.82803 km).

Periodic encroachment on to the track resulted in a late start to the racing programme that consisted of 6 events and subsequent non-completion of the final event. Police vehicles equipped with speaker systems were used in an attempt to keep the spectators off the track throughout the course of the day of racing. An estimated total of six thousand cars were parked on the grounds of Leyburn Airfield with seven planes landing in the morning transporting spectators to the event.

The significant number of people in attendance necessitated a variety of seating methods including bales of wool and large petrol drums on the backs of delivery trucks.

The Queensland Motor Sporting Club booked out all of the available accommodation within a total radius of 40 miles (Approximately 64.3738 km) of Leyburn for any competitors travelling from the southern parts of Australia, with any left over accommodation available for members of the public to apply to the club for.

Leyburn Airfield track 
The 1949 Australian Grand was hosted at former airbase and RAAF aerodrome, Leyburn Airfield. The airfield is located in the south eastern Darling Downs region of Queensland, at an approximate distance of 37 kilometres from Toowoomba.

The airfield was selected to host the 1949 Australian Grand Prix due to its features conducive to a racing format. The course was roughly triangular and consists of two main racing straights in the form of runways. The two runways are both 150 feet wide (approximately 1.63 km by 45.7m) and connected by a 50 foot wide (approximately 15.24m) perimeter track.

The airfield was tar-sealed and despite the undulating country of the Darling Downs, was almost on flat ground. The flat nature of Leyburn Airfield meant that an unrestricted view for spectators around the entire circuit from all of the vantage points was permitted.

Due to the runways straight disposition, fast speeds were attainable with great safety. On the long straight of 7,000 feet (approximately 2.14 km) speeds were estimated to reach maximums of between 130 and 140 miles per hour (approximately between 209.215 kilometres per hour to 225.308 kilometres per hour).

Competing cars

Delahaye 
John Crouch contested the race in a Delahaye 135MS. He finished the first lap in second place behind leader Frank Kleinig who was driving a Hudson Special. Crouch led the race at the end of the seventeenth lap, a whole lap ahead of Kleinig in second place. He went on to win the race in 1h 49m 25.2s in what was to be the first and only Australian Grand Prix win for a Delahaye.

Studebaker 
A Studebaker Special was raced by Charlie Whatmore in the 1949 Australian Grand Prix. Whatmore was unable to complete the race retiring early due to reporting a leaking fuel tank, only completing a total of 10 laps out of the 35.

MG 
An MG TC was raced in the 1949 Australian Grand Prix by 2nd-place finisher, Ray Gordon who finished with a time of 1h 54m 12.2s.

Ray Gordon was in third position after the seventeenth lap, a lap and a half behind the leader.

In addition to the MG TC Midget, MG also raced another model of their vehicles in, the MG Magna. The Magna was driven by Ken Tubman who was forced to retire during the 1949 Australian Grand Prix after completing 12 laps.

Many competitors who raced in MG manufactured vehicles were forced to retire during the 1949 Australian Grand Prix. Les Taylor, Vic Johnson, John Nind, Garry Coglan, Dick Cobden and George Pearse all competed in MG vehicles and were forced to retire during the race. None of which completed more than 27 laps, achieved by Vic Johnson. With George Pearse only managing to complete 2 laps in his MG TB.

Hudson 
In the 1949 Australian Grand Prix a Hudson Special was driven by Frank Kleinig who started the race on pole position. The time for Kleing's first lap was 3 minutes and 1 second or 83.5 miles per hour (approximately 134.3802 kilometres per hour). Kleinig continued to lead Crouch after seven laps, but in the eighth lap was required to pit due to the need for an engine adjustment. Following his engine adjustment to the Hudson Special, Frank Kleinig was more than a lap behind Crouch.

The Hudson Special was not able to finish the race, being forced into pit lane on two occasions with engine fan problems before being forced to retire after completing 21 laps.

Riley Special 
Arthur Rizzo drove a Riley Special. He was one of the eleven competitors out of the 28 that started to complete the race, finishing in third place. Rizzo's time for the race was 1h 56m 56.8s.

Retirements 
Throughout the 35 lap duration of the 1949 Australian Grand Prix many of the racers were forced to retire for a number of mechanical reasons.

Keith Thallon driving the Jaguar SS100 was forced to retire after completing 10 laps due to trouble with a main bearing. Arthur Bowes retired after 5 laps in the Hudson Special as a result of engine problems. Snow Sefton was forced to retire after completing 11 laps in the Strathpine Special due to an overheating issue. Rex Law was forced to retire from the race after 8 laps in the Buick Special due to overwhelming brake issues. Charlie Whatmore after completing 10 laps was forced to retire due to a leaking fuel tank that he had incurred in the Studebaker Special. Dick Reed who raced in the G Reed Ford Special after blowing a tyre at a corner during the 26th lap of the race.

Classification

Notes
Fastest lap: John Crouch and Frank Kleinig – 2'52, 90 mph (144.8 km/h)

Handicap award
A concurrent handicap award was won by Luke (Bugatti Type 37) with an adjusted time of 1 hour 39 minutes 7.4 seconds. Second on handicap was Gordon from Brydon, Critchley and Crouch .

References

Grand Prix
Australian Grand Prix
Sports competitions in Queensland
Australian Grand Prix